Rybinsk is the name of several inhabited localities in Russia.

Urban localities
Rybinsk, a city in Yaroslavl Oblast

Rural localities
Rybinsk, Irkutsk Oblast, a village in Tayshetsky District of Irkutsk Oblast
Rybinsk, Novosibirsk Oblast, a village in Bolotninsky District of Novosibirsk Oblast; 
Rybinsk, Tomsk Oblast, a settlement in Verkhneketsky District of Tomsk Oblast